Parvoolithus is an oogenus of Mongolian fossil eggs from the Campanian Barun Goyot Formation. They are known from a single small, smooth egg, which cannot be assigned to any known oofamily. It is very similar to the eggs of modern birds in many aspects; in fact, a cladistic analysis by Zelenitsky and Therrien found it to be a sister taxon to the guinea fowl (genus Numida), indicating that they represent the eggs of birds, rather than a non-avialan theropod.

References

Bibliography 
 K. E. Mikhailov. 1996. New genera of fossil eggs from the Upper Cretaceous of Mongolia. Paleontological Journal 30(2):246-248

Egg fossils
Late Cretaceous animals of Asia
Campanian life
Cretaceous Mongolia
Fossils of Mongolia
Barun Goyot Formation
Fossil parataxa described in 1996